Bull Demon King, also translated as the Ox King and known as his self-proclaimed title the Great Sage Who Pacifies Heaven, is a fictional character from the 16th century novel Journey to the West. He is the husband of the Princess Iron Fan and father of Red Boy. He is a demon king based in Sky Scraping Cave (摩雲洞 Móyún-dòng) on Accumulated Thunder Mountain (積雷山 Jīléi-shān).

Bull King is a major antagonist of the novel Journey to the West by Wu Cheng'en, and its multiple adaptations. He can actually be considered to be the main antagonist of the story, despite his limited appearances. He also appears as the main villain in the 2014 film The Monkey King and as the main antagonist in Doraemon: The Record of Nobita's Parallel Visit to the West. He is one of the most popular Journey to the West villains, alongside his wife Princess Iron Fan, his son the Red Boy, the Six Eared Macaque, and the Baigujing.

He was possibly influenced by Ox-Head, one of the guardians of hell in Chinese mythology.

Part in Journey to the West
In the early chapters of the novel, he becomes sworn brothers with Sun Wukong and six other demon kings, the Saurian Demon King (蛟魔王 Jiāo Mówáng), the Single-Horned Demon King (單角魔王 Dānjiǎo Mówáng), the Roc Demon King (鵬魔王 Péng Mówáng), the Lion Spirit King (獅狔王 Shīnǐ Wáng), the Macaque Spirit King (獼猴王 Míhóu Wáng) and the Snub-nosed monkey Spirit King (禺狨王 Yúróng Wáng). He is ranked the most senior of the seven, and styles himself "Great Sage Who Pacifies Heaven" (平天大聖). He marries Princess Iron Fan and has a son, Red Boy, with her. He appears again in a later chapter when the protagonists arrive at the Flaming Mountains along their journey. Sun Wukong disguises himself as Bull Demon King to deceive Princess Iron Fan and takes away her Banana Leaf Fan. The real Bull Demon King visits Princess Iron Fan, who then realises she has been tricked. Bull Demon King disguises himself as Zhu Bajie to trick Sun Wukong and retrieves the fan. In the ensuing fight against Sun Wukong and Zhu Bajie, Bull Demon King reveals his true form, a giant white bull, and attempts to charge towards his opponents. Nezha shows up, captures Bull Demon King, and brings him to Heaven to let the Jade Emperor decide his fate.

Adaptations
 Bowser, the main antagonist of the Mario video game franchise, was inspired by the Ox-King. Nintendo designer Shigeru Miyamoto has stated that he first envisioned Bowser as an ox, basing him on the Ox-King from the 1960 anime film Alakazam the Great.
 In the adaptation in the 1996 Journey to the West series, the Bull King and the Princess Iron Fan have already known Monkey since childhood (they went to the same school that taught Monkey his fighting abilities) and were willing to give him the fan. But their obnoxious son, Red Boy, refuses to let his mother give the fan, thus forcing Monkey to enter her belly to force her to give him the fan.
 In the 1988 film Doraemon: The Record of Nobita's Parallel Visit to the West as the main antagonist. In the film, he becomes ruler of Japan after Doraemon and Nobita accidentally release monsters from a 22nd-century game based on Journey to the West. As a result, the protagonist's loved ones are also converted into demons. In order to save Japan, they travel in time to prevent this from happening.
 In the 2014 film The Monkey King, the Bull Demon King (Aaron Kwok) is waging war on Heaven. Much of Heaven is destroyed during the battle, and the Bull Demon King faces off against the Jade Emperor (Chow Yun-fat), the ruler of Heaven. The Bull Demon King is defeated but before the Jade Emperor can kill the Bull Demon King...
 In the LEGO theme Monkie Kid, which is based on Journey to the West, the Demon Bull King is the main antagonist, seeking to take over a modernized world alongside his wife and son. In the animated series based on the theme, he is voiced by Steven Blum.
 In the Dragon Ball franchise, the Bull Demon King is referred to as The Ox King, is a human with incredible physical attributes and is the father of the Iron Fan Princess instead of husband who is known as Chi-Chi.

See also
 List of media adaptations of Journey to the West
 Ravana

References

Journey to the West characters
Fictional demons and devils